This is a list of chicken breeds usually considered to be of Belgian origin. Some may have complex or obscure histories, so inclusion here does not necessarily imply that a breed is predominantly or exclusively from Belgium.The Campine is included here, but in Belgium is not considered to be a breed but, since 1926, to be identical to the Braekel.

References

Lists of Belgian domestic animal breeds
 
Chicken breeds